Romance verbs are the most inflected part of speech in the language family. In the transition from Latin to the Romance languages, verbs went through many phonological, syntactic, and semantic changes. Most of the distinctions present in classical Latin continued to be made, but synthetic forms were often replaced with more analytic ones. Other verb forms changed meaning, and new forms also appeared.

Overview 
The following tables present a comparison of the conjugation of the regular verb amare "to love" in Classical Latin, and Vulgar Latin (reconstructed as Proto-Italo-Western Romance, with stress marked), and nine modern Romance languages. The conjugations below were given from their respective Wiktionary pages.

{{notelist|refs=

{{efn|name=eight|Fell into disuse in modern Portuguese, now found only in literary texts. Nowadays largely replaced by the compound forms tinha amado" or havia amado (had loved).}}

}}

Note that the Vulgar Latin reconstructions are believed to have regularized word stress within each tense (except the present and imperative tenses). Many verb forms undergoes elisions, like the indicative pluperfect amāveram > *amára and the subjunctive imperfect amāvissem > *amásse.

The verb "to love" in Old French , the early form of modern French is rather irregular but still follows its regular sound changes, with having aim- in stressed forms (namely the singular and third person plural of indicative and subjunctive present tenses, and the second person singular imperative), and the stem changes again to ain- before -s and -t in subjunctive present. In Catalan, the verb amar has replaced by synonymous , the former usually used only in poetic contexts.

 Vulgar Latin 
In this section, "Vulgar Latin" is actually reconstructed as reconstructed Proto-Italo-Western Romance, most notably the shift from Classical Latin -i- and -u- to -e- /e/ and -o- /o/, as opposed to inherited /ɛ/ and /ɔ/ respectively. The developments include:
 The -v- of the perfect tenses were dropped or elided, but sometimes become /u/ after vowels.
 The past participle were sometimes sporadically rounded to *-ū-, this situation is preserved in French. 
 The "unstressed" indicative imperfect is very likely from shortened *-bămus, *-bătis, yielding to the stress on the third-from-last syllable (amābāmus), as opposed to Classical Latin stress on the second-from-last syllable (amābāmus). Languages which retains this irregular stress were the languages of Iberia, Sicilian, and French.
 Romance metaphony. In forms containing -ī next to mid-open vowels, especially in preterite forms were heightened.

In the Proto-Romance grammatical tradition, the second and third conjugation are known as third conjugation, similarly to French.

 First conjugation 
Verbs in the first conjugation are in -āre (*-áre), later evolved to -are in Italian, -ar in most Romance languages and -er in French.

 Second conjugation 
Verbs in the second conjugation are in -ēre (*-ére), later evolved to -ere in Italian, -er in most Romance languages and -oir in French (no "regular" -oir verbs). Another infinitive -ere has merged into this paradigm.

 Third conjugation 
Verbs in the second conjugation are in -ere (*-ere, caused stress in previous syllable), later merged with -ere (*-ere, causes stress in antepenultimate syllable), but -re in French and Catalan. The suffix -re in French are in the third group, also known as irregular verbs. 

The -iō variant (*-io in Vulgar Latin) now defunct, later merged with the second conjugation; the paradigm now only exists in some descendants of the verb faciō.

 Fourth conjugation 
Verbs in the fourth conjugation are in -īre (*-íre), later evolved to -ire in Italian, and -ir in most Romance languages. This conjugation type are infixed with once-inchoative -īsc- → *-ísc- in some languages, but its placement varies.

In Italian, Catalan, and Romanian, the infix -isc-; -esc-, -eix- (Catalan), and -ăsc- (Romanian) is placed on once-stressed indicative and subjunctive present forms (the first-, second-, third-singular and third plural present tenses), and stressed imperatives. In French, the infix -iss- is placed on all indicative present forms, the indicative imperfect, the subjunctive present, and plural imperatives.

While there are few non-infixed -īre verbs (also known are pure -īre verbs), in French the infixed verbs are the only regular verbs, otherwise irregular.

 Modern languages 
While the nominal morphology in Romance languages is primarily agglutinative, the verbal morphology is fusional. The verbs are highly inflected for numbers (singular and plural), persons (first-, second-, and third-person), moods (indicative, conditional, subjunctive, and imperative), tenses (present, past, future), and aspects (imperfective and perfective). 

Because of the complexities in Romance conjugation, certain languages have a separate article regarding these conjugations:

 Italian conjugation
 Spanish verbs
 Portuguese verb conjugation
 Romanian verbs
 French conjugation
 Catalan verbs
 Occitan conjugation
 Sardinian conjugation

While there are 4 regular infinitives in Classical Latin, namely -āre, -ēre, -ere, and -īre, some of these infinitive were merged. In many Romance languages including Spanish and Portuguese, the main infinitives are -ar, -er, and -ir, with addition of -ôr (Portuguese only) which only exists in the verb , traditionally considered as -er verbs. While in Italian, the infinitives are -are, -ere, -ire. The infinitives -er and -ere (Italian) resulted from the merge of Latin infinitives -ēre and -ere. In French, the infinitives are -er, -oir, -re, -ir, but verbs with -oir and -re are in the third group, also known as irregular verbs.

 Irregularities 

In many Romance languages, verb stems ending in -c, -z shown above were regularly altered to preserve its pronunciation. However, it is not considered as irregular verbs.

 True irregular verbs 

 Copula 

While the passive voice became completely periphrastic in Romance, the active voice has been morphologically preserved to a greater or lesser extent. For simplicity, only the first person singular is listed for finite forms. Note that certain forms in Romance languages come from the suppletive sources sedeo (to be seated) instead of sum, e.g. subjunctive present: sedea > sia, sea, seja... (medieval Galician-Portuguese, for instance, had double forms in the whole conjugation: sou/sejo, era/sia, fui/sevi, fora/severa, fosse/sevesse...)

 Other irregular verbs 
 "To have": The verb  was regularly conjugated in Classical Latin, but later tends to be highly irregular in the Romance languages. The verb later transformed to *haveō in many Romance languages (but etymologically Spanish ), resulting in irregular indicative present forms *ai, *as, and *at (all first-, second- and third-person singular), but ho, hai, ha in Italian and -pp- (appo) in Logudorese Sardinian in present tenses. 
In Logudorese Sardinian, two -b-es lost in imperfect tenses.
In French, the past participle eu including the perfect stems (past historic and subjunctive imperfect stems) eu-/eû- rather evolved from earlier *habū-.

This is the Vulgar Latin conjugation of the verb *avére:

Notice that these forms sometimes also have an inconsistent form, as the table above more resembling with that of French.

 "To do": The verb  is also irregular in Classical Latin, with fēc- before perfect tenses (although the passive form of the verb was supplied by fīō, this suppletion is not included as the passive voice became periphrastic). This verb is one of the few verbs that retains perfect ablaut in Romance languages, with some changing the perfect stem to fi- due to metaphony rules.

Semantic changes

In spite of the remarkable continuity of form, several Latin tenses have changed meaning, especially subjunctives.
 The verbal noun became a present participle in all Romance languages except in Italian and Romanian, where it became a gerund, and Sardinian, where it does not exist. However, the French and Catalan suffixes -ant conflate with the accusative of present active participle suffix -āntem.
 The supine became a past participle in all Romance languages.
 The pluperfect indicative became a conditional in Sicilian, and an imperfect subjunctive in Spanish.
 The pluperfect subjunctive developed into an imperfect subjunctive in all languages except Romansh, where it became a conditional, and Romanian, where it became a pluperfect indicative.
 The future perfect indicative became a future subjunctive in Old Spanish, Portuguese, and Galician.

The Latin imperfect subjunctive underwent a change in syntactic status, becoming a personal infinitive in Portuguese and Galician. An alternative hypothesis traces the personal infinitive back to the Latin infinitive, not to a conjugated verb form.

Periphrases

In many cases, the empty cells in the tables above exist as distinct compound verbs in the modern languages. Thus, the main tense and mood distinctions in classical Latin are still made in most modern Romance languages, though some are now expressed through compound rather than simple verbs. Some examples, from Romanian:

 Perfect indicative: am fost, ai fost, a fost, am fost, ați fost, au fost;
 Future indicative: voi fi, vei fi, va fi, vom fi, veți fi, vor fi;
 Future perfect indicative: voi fi fost, vei fi fost, va fi fost, vom fi fost, veți fi fost, vor fi fost.

New forms also developed, such as the conditional, which in most Romance languages started out as a periphrasis, but later became a simple tense. In Romanian, the conditional is still periphrastic: aș fi, ai fi, ar fi, am fi, ați fi, ar fi.

See also
 Romance languages
 Vulgar Latin

Notes

References

 Paola Monachesi, The Verbal Complex in Romance: A Case Study in Grammatical Interfaces''. Oxford: Oxford University Press, 2005.

Romance languages
Indo-European verbs